Ralph Walpole (died 1302) was a medieval Bishop of Norwich and Bishop of Ely.

Life

Walpole was Archdeacon of Ely by 6 February 1272.

Walpole was elected to the see of Norwich on 11 November 1288 and consecrated on 20 March 1289.

Walpole was translated to the see of Ely on 5 June 1299. He died on 20 March 1302.

Citations

References

Further reading

 

Bishops of Ely

13th-century births
1302 deaths
Bishops of Norwich
Year of birth unknown
13th-century English Roman Catholic bishops